Universal conductance fluctuations (UCF) in mesoscopic physics is a phenomenon encountered in electrical transport experiments in mesoscopic species. The measured electrical conductance will vary from sample to sample, mainly due to inhomogeneous scattering sites. Fluctuations originate from coherence effects for electronic wavefunctions and thus the phase-coherence length  needs be larger than the momentum relaxation length . For weakly localized samples fluctuation in conductance is equal to fundamental conductance  regardless of the number of channels.

Many factors will influence the amplitude of UCF. At zero temperature without decoherence, the UCF is influenced by mainly two factors, the symmetry and the shape of the sample. Recently, a third key factor, anisotropy of Fermi surface, is also found to fundamentally influence the amplitude of UCF.

See also 

 Speckle patterns, the optical analogues of conductance fluctuation patterns.

References

General references 

 Akkermans and Montambaux, Mesoscopic Physics of Electrons and Photons, Cambridge University Press (2007)
 Supriyo Datta, Electronic Transport in Mesoscopic Systems, Cambridge University Press (1995)
 R. Saito, G. Dresselhaus and M. S. Dresselhaus, Physical Properties of Carbon Nanotubes,  Imperial College Press (1998)
 
 Boris Altshuler (1985), Pis'ma Zh. Eksp. Teor. Fiz. 41: 530 [JETP Lett. 41: 648] .

Mesoscopic physics
Quantum mechanics